Greater Noida Press Club is a social organization of journalists from Noida, Greater Noida and Delhi NCR. It works for journalists' professional, social and economic development. The aim of the organization is to develop high standards in journalism and protect the rights of journalists. Greater Noida Press Club was established on 24 July 2003. The idea of establishing a press club in Greater Noida was after seeing the organizations and associations of journalists In cities like Meerut, Muzaffarnagar and Saharanpur.

Rejuvenation 
For the unfortunate reasons, Greater Noida press club got stalled immediately after the establishment. In the year of 2014, the organization was re-organized under the leadership of young journalists Pankaj Parashar, Rohit Priyadarshan and Rajesh Bhati. Now the Press Club is organizing programs on national, social and economic issues and working fast to achieve its goals.

Shabd Madhu 
Shabd Madhu is the mouthpiece of Greater Noida Press Club. Articles from top journalists of India, China and Pakistan are being published in this magazine.

References

Indian journalism organisations